Deeper Waters is the first album of duo Robin and Linda Williams on the Red House Records label, released in 2004.

Deeper Waters marks the 30th anniversary as a recording and touring unit for Robin and Linda Williams. They wrote or co-wrote all but one track. Guest vocalists include Iris DeMent, Mary Chapin Carpenter, Schuyler Fisk, and actress Sissy Spacek.

Allmusic states "The Williams have issued what amounts to nothing short of a masterpiece and perhaps their most inspired recorded moment. Deeper Waters is a testament to the stories that are seldom told yet lived in every community, era, and household. This is the place where love, grief, loss, endings, and beginnings are given utterance: to whisper, weep, laugh, and reflect as they move through lives both ghostly and grand."

Track listing

Personnel
Linda Williams – vocals, banjo, guitar, background vocals
Robin Williams – vocals, guitar, background vocals
Mark Schatz – bass
Rickie Simpkins – fiddle
Jim Watson – mandolin, background vocals
Mike Auldridge – dobro
Mary Chapin Carpenter – background vocals
Iris DeMent – background vocals
Schuyler Fisk – background vocals
Sissy Spacek – background vocals
John Jennings – guitar
Jimmy Gaudreau – mandolin, mandola
Kevin McNoldy – bass, background vocals

Production notes
Produced, mixed and mastered by Kevin McNoldy
Assistant producers - Robin & Linda Williams
Engineered by Trip Faulconer, Kevin McNoldy and Matt Jagger
Art direction and design by Carla Leighton
Photography by Michael "Mick" Wilson

References

External links
Official Site

2004 albums
Robin and Linda Williams albums
Red House Records albums